The Southern Jê languages are a branch of the Jê languages constituted by the Kaingang and Laklãnõ (Xokléng) languages. Together with the closely related Ingain, they form the Paraná Jê branch of the Jê family.

References

Jê languages
Languages of Brazil